General Trading Participants of the Tokyo Stock Exchange

ABN AMRO Clearing Tokyo
Ace Securities
Aizawa Securities
Akakiya Securities
Ando Securities
Ark Securities
Barclays Capital Japan Limited
BNP Paribas
Chibagin Securities
Citigroup Global Markets Japan
CLICK Securities
Cosmo Securities
Credit Suisse Securities (Japan) Limited
Daiko Clearing Services
Daiwa Securities
Daiwa Securities Capital Markets
Deutsche Securities
Dojimakanto Securities
Eiwa Securities
Goldman Sachs Japan
Hachijuni Securities
The Hikari Securities
The Hinode Securities
Hirota Securities
HSBC Securities (Japan)
H.S. Securities
Ichiyoshi Securities
IDO Securities
Imamura Securities
Interactive Brokers Securities Japan
Instinet Japan
Iwai Securities
Japan Asia Securities
J.P. Morgan Securities Japan
Jefferies (Japan)
Jyoko Securities
Jyujiya Securities
Kabu.com Securities
Kaneyama Securities
Kazaka Securities
Kimura Securities
Kosei Securities
Kurokawakitoku Securities
Kyokuto Securities
Kyowa Securities
Leading Securities
Macquarie Capital Securities (Japan) Limited
Maeda Securities
Marufuku Securities
Maruhachi Securities
Marukuni Securities
Marusan Securities
Matsui Securities
Meiwa Securities
Merrill Lynch Japan Securities
MF Global FXA Securities
Miki Securities
Mita Securities
Mito Securities
Mitsubishi UFJ Morgan Stanley Securities
Mizuho Securities
Mizuho Investors Securities
Monex Group
Morgan Stanley MUFG Securities
The Murosei Securities
Nagano Securities
Naito Securities
The Nakahara Securities
The Naruse Securities
Natixis
Newedge Japan
New-S Securities
Niigata Securities
Nikko Cordial Securities
Nishimura Securities
Nissan Century Securities
Nomura Securities
Nozomi Securities
Okachi Securities
Okasan Securities
RBS Securities Japan
Rakuten Securities
Retela Crea Securities
San-ei Securities
Sanko Securities
SBI Securities
Securities Japan
SMBC Friend Securities
Société Générale Securities (North Pacific)
The Tachibana Securitie
Takagi Securities
Tokai Tokyo Securities
Toyo Securities
UBS Securities Japan
Utsumiya Securities
Yahata Securities
Yamagen Securities
Yamani Securities
Yamawa Securities
The Yutaka Securities

References

 
Tokyo Stock Exchange members
Stock Exchange members